Dr Abubakar Buba Atare II (born Kokiya Abubakar Buba Atare 16 August 1987) is the second Mai or King of Tula Chiefdom, who was crowned on 21 December 2009 after the death of his father Buba K. Atare on 13 December 2009. Mai Abubakar was at the time of his appointment an engineering undergraduate student of Middlesex University, Dubai, United Arab Emirates. Dr Abubakar Kokiya Atare Buba is  the second Mai or King of Tula Chiefdom in Kaltungo Local Government Area of Gombe State. and is the secretary Gombe State  Council of Emirs & Chiefs. The Mai in 2017, donated a parcel of land for the construction of a golf course in  Tula. he made the announcement during the opening ceremony of the maiden edition of Gombe Talba Open (GT Open) golf tournament at the Gongila Valley Golf Court, Ashaka Cement Factory in Gombe State. In 2018 during the annual tula cultural day HRH Mai Tula Dr Abubakar Kokiya Buba Atare II called on his people of Tula and the entire Southern Gombe Tangale Waja to be more united, an occasion that was graced by the Executive Governor of Gombe State Ibrahim Hassan Dankwambo and the Emir of Misau HRH Ahmed Sulaiman  who was a former secretary to the Bauchi state Government. In November 2017 the Mai attended the funeral rites of Daktibe Jalingo and his son who were murdered by gunmen, a gesture which we almost never see between kings and their subjects, in his speech he condemned the attack and tasked the authorities to apprehend the culprits in order to face full wrath of the law

Educational background
His Royal Highness attended Abubakar Tafawa Balewa University staff school Bauchi for his primary education, then proceeded to federal Government college Kwali in Abuja and subsequently federal government college Billiri in Gombe State for his secondary education. he was admitted into University of Abuja to study Geography which he later left to enrolled in Middlesex University London (Dubai Campus) where he graduated with B.Sc. Hons Software Engineering with IT & BIS.

Work
Network Station Manager at CISCO Systems, Dubai Internet City, UAE before his appointment as the "Mai" or King of Tula Chiefdom.

References

1987 births
Living people
Emirs
Nigerian traditional rulers
People from Gombe State
21st-century monarchs